Maria José Dupré, also known as Sra. Leandro Dupré (1905 – 15 May 1984), was one of the most popular and prolific Brazilian writers of the 1940s and 1950s.

Early life
Born in 1905 in a small town in the state of São Paulo, Dupré published her first story "Uma Família Antiga de Jaboticabal" ("An Old Family from Jaboticabal") in the newspaper O Estado de S. Paulo in 1978.

Novels
Dupré published her first novel, O Romance de Teresa Bernard ("The Romance of Teresa Bernard"), in 1941. Her next novel, Éramos Seis, was written in 1943 and praised by writer and critic Monteiro Lobato and became a best-seller. Chronicling the struggles of a middle-class family in São Paulo, the novel was awarded the Raul Pompeia Prize for best work of 1943 by the Brazilian Academy of Letters. Dupré wrote Luz e Sombra ("Light and Dark") in 1944, Gina in 1945, and Os Rodriguez ("The Rodriguezes") in 1946. She published a sequel to Éramos Seis called Dona Lola in 1949.

Impact
Éramos Seis has been adapted as a telenovela five times, in 1958, 1967, 1977, 1994 and 2019.

Later life
Dupré died on 15 May 1984 in Guarujá, São Paulo, Brazil.

References

1905 births
1984 deaths
People from Guarujá
20th-century Brazilian women writers
Brazilian women novelists
20th-century Brazilian novelists